The 1952–53 DFB-Pokal was the 10th season of the annual German football cup competition. The DFB-Pokal was formerly known as Tschammer und Osten Pokal, or Tschammerpokal. It was the first time the cup was held after World War II. 32 teams competed in the tournament of five rounds. The competition began on 17 August 1952 and ended on 11 May 1953. In the final Rot-Weiss Essen defeated Alemannia Aachen 2–1.

The replay match between Hamborn and St. Pauli was the first football match in Germany covered live by television.

Matches

First round

Replay

Round of 16

Replays

Quarter-finals

Semi-finals

Final

References

External links
 Official site of the DFB 
 Kicker.de 
 1952–53 results at Fussballdaten.de 

1952-53
1952–53 in German football cups